Kiryl Kniazeu (born 9 March 1990) is a Belarusian handball player for Energa MKS Kalisz and the Belarusian national team.

References

1990 births
Living people
People from Slutsk
Belarusian male handball players
Expatriate handball players in Poland
Belarusian expatriate sportspeople in Poland
Sportspeople from Minsk Region